Roger Waring, D.D. was Archdeacon of Dromore from 1683 until his death in 1692.

Waring was born in Belfast and educated at Trinity College, Dublin. Waring was a friend of Jonathan Swift.

Notes

17th-century Irish Anglican priests
Archdeacons of Dromore
Alumni of Trinity College Dublin
Clergy from Belfast
1692 deaths